Zeyda and the Hitman (U.S. title Running with the Hitman) is a 2004 Canadian television comedy film directed by Melanie Mayron and starring Judd Hirsch, Gil Bellows, Danny Aiello, Mercedes Ruehl, Conrad Dunn, and Reagan Pasternak. The story is about a grandfather who hires a contract killer to assassinate his allergy-prone son-in-law.

Production
Zeyda and the Hitman was filmed in Winnipeg, Manitoba, Canada. The title design was by Cuppa Coffee Studios, Toronto.  The film was released on DVD on 5 September 2006, and carries an MPAA rating of NR.

Based on a true story
The film's storyline is based on the true-life "peanut plot" case related in Adrian Humphreys' biography of Marvin "the Weasel" Elkind, titled The Weasel: A Double Life in the Mob. A man (named Gideon Schub in the film and played by Judd Hirsch) hired Marvin Elkind (named Nathan "The Nat" Winkler in the film and played by Danny Aiello) to kill his son-in-law (named Jeff Klein in the film and played by Gil Bellows), who had a problematic relationship with his daughter. Moreover, she had faxed her father a letter advising him that he could not see his grandchildren, aged 10 and five, without her husband’s permission.

As he was severely allergic to peanuts, he suggested that Elkind poison his food with a smear of peanut butter or his drink with drop of peanut oil, to trigger death by anaphylactic shock. He gave the would-be hitman a $1,000 downpayment for the hit, $200 to buy him drinks, and the murder weapons: a jar of Kraft peanut butter and a bottle of peanut oil.  Elkind, a police informant who also worked in the criminal underworld as well as volunteered as a security officer at the synagogue where he and the man met, turned him in to the police and testified against him in court. He still had the receipts for the murder weapons in his pocket, when arrested.

References

External links
 
 CTV (official site)
 Title sequence (Nick Sewell)

2004 television films
2004 films
Canadian comedy television films
English-language Canadian films
2000s English-language films
Films directed by Melanie Mayron
Films shot in Winnipeg
2004 comedy films
2000s Canadian films